A music transposer is a software program, physical or electronic device for the transposition of musical notes and/or chords from one note/key to another. It simply consists of two identical scales which can be moved in relation to each other to give the required result.

See also
 List of music software

References

Music software
Music hardware
Musical composition